Goriški Vrh is a dispersed settlement in the hills north of Dravograd in the Carinthia region in northern Slovenia, right on the border with Austria.

References

External links
Goriški Vrh on Geopedia

Populated places in the Municipality of Dravograd